Tokogeny or tocogeny is the biological relationship between parent and offspring, or more generally between ancestors and descendants.  In contradistinction to phylogeny it applies to individual organisms as opposed to species.

In the tokogentic system shared characteristics are called traits.

References

Biology